El Yunque may refer to:

Geography
 El Yunque (Chile), the highest point on Robinson Crusoe Island, Chile
 El Yunque (Cuba), a table-top shaped mountain in Cuba 
 El Yunque National Forest, a rainforest in eastern Puerto Rico (formerly, Caribbean National Forest)
 El Yunque (Puerto Rico), the second-tallest mountain within El Yunque National Forest

Organizations
 El Yunque (organization), Mexican political organization